Dimiao, officially the Municipality of Dimiao,  is a 4th class municipality in the province of Bohol, Philippines. According to the 2020 census, it has a population of 14,889 people.

History

When the parish was founded is uncertain, although baptism records dates back to the year 1750. It is one of the older municipalities of Bohol, with a population of 8,820 in 1897. This town used to cover a large area that included the municipalities of Valencia and Lila. In 1867, Valencia was separated from Dimiao because of increased population, and Lila was made an independent municipality on 1 January 1915.

Geography

Barangays
Dimiao comprises 35 barangays:

Climate

Demographics

Economy

The people of Dimiao lives on farming, tubâ-gathering, rope-making and fishing since it is located along the coast. Rice, corn, maguey, copra, rope, mango and tubâ are their most important products.

Attractions

The town of Dimiao has its share of Bohol's list of natural and man-made attractions.

Dimiao Church The San Nicholas Church is one of the oldest stone churches of Bohol, built in the later half of the 19th century. It is identified by its twin bell towers either side of the church's front façade, and it is dedicated to San Nicolas Tolentino, who is also the town's patron saint and whose feast day is celebrated 10 September. In front of the church building is a tower with the image of the Sacred Heart of Jesus where the "hugos" is done during dawn rites (salubong) of Easter Sunday. The church houses some relics from the Spanish Regime and is being preserved.

The building behind the church served once as a convent but is now a school. Fronting the Sacred Heart tower is a monument dedicated to the Philippines' national hero, José Rizal. Across from the church, across the circumferential road lies the municipal hall, a typical Spanish-designed building with prominent arched windows, white painted walls and red roof.

 The Ermita Ruins are the ruins of a coralline limestone structure built during the Spanish Regime. It lies parallel to the nave of the St. Nicholas Tolentino Church. It was allegedly used as a military fortress, a chapel and a burial site of the members of the Spanish clergy. Archaeological excavations were undertaken in 1995 and 1998 in a quest to uncover its mysterious past.

Balbalan Beach Balbalan Beach lies on a long stretch of white sandy beach facing the Mindanao Sea. It is only five minutes drive away from the town center in Balbalan. The waters are unpolluted and crystal clear, very ideal for swimming. Out in the deep are colorful coral reefs. Sailing is also a pastime in the area but make sure that you finished all of your activities before the sunsets or else, manananggals will feast on your poor body when you are out in the open at night. This is how the town got its name, balbal means to eat out the innards of humans like an animal, in reference to the manananggals in the area...or if you really want to stay here at night, better bring out some big guns with a dash of holy guidance after a priestly confession.

Seaside Beach Resort Seaside Beach Resort once called Imelda Beach in Luyo boast a stretch of white sand fringed with tall coconut palm trees. The waters are clear and unpolluted. The beach is fairly accessible, lying along the National Highway. It was once the venue of an encampment of the Boys and Girls Scouts of Bohol.  On clear sunny days, Camiguin Island with the silhouette of Mount Hibok-Hibok can be seen.

Its rugged pathway is a challenge to trekkers who are rewarded with a panoramic view of the falls upon arrival. Dry land near the foot of the falls is ideal for picnics.

A natural basin carved out from underneath the falling waters serves as a natural swimming pool for bathers. Two caves lie near the falls with rock formations carved by centuries of gushing waters; one cavern has a naturally-contoured basin that fills up with water before flowing outwards from the cave.

Ingkumhan Falls At Bahugan.

Dam-agan Falls At Catugasan.

Rice Terraces Although not as large nor prominent as the rice terraces of Banaue, the terraces look like a velvety green layered field, and during near-harvest season, the fields turn into gold.

MacArthur's Cap The MacArthur's Cap is a rock formation resembling an army officer's cap that one encounters when entering the town of Dimiao. The rock formation has become an emblem and called such at the successful return of General Douglas MacArthur, upon the defeat of the Japanese Army during World War II.

Badiang Peak Badiang Peak is a rugged mountain of Dimiao which can be visited by trekkers and mountain climbers. Hours of trekking along pathways and climbing over boulders are rewarded with a panoramic view of Dimiao and its neighboring lowlands from the mountain peak.

Fish Sanctuary At Taongon Can-andam

Education

The town has schools scattered throughout the barangays.  Those located at the town proper are the Banban Elementary School, the Dimiao National High School and a private one, the St. Nicholas Academy. 90% of the inhabitants are literate and most speak some English and Filipino.

References

Sources

External links

 [ Philippine Standard Geographic Code]
Municipality of Dimiao
Dimiao
Dimiao attractions

Municipalities of Bohol